Rubindi is a town in Mbarara District, Greater Mbarara region, Ankole sub-region, Western Uganda.

Location

Overview
Rubindi is a busy growing town in Kashari, it has the largest of fresh produce in the county with most of the produce coming from Buhweju District.
It has the headquarters of Rubindi Subcounty and it is also a hometown of Urban Tibamanya former Member of Parliament Kashari county and Minister of Urban Development.
The current member of Parliament for Kashari Yaguma Wilberforce also hails from Rubindi.
North of Rubindi is Ruhumba and together they were consolidated to form the Rubindi-Ruhumba town board. The town is soon waiting for a town council status

Population
As of 2014 the population of Rubindi is not yet known

Points of Interest
 Rubindi Health Centre III
 Rubindi Catholic parish
 Rubindi weekly market
 Lady's care salon & cosmetics

References

Populated places in Uganda